Christopher Henry Difford (born 4 November 1954) is an English musician. He is a founding member and songwriter of the rock group Squeeze.

Musical career
Born in Greenwich, London, Difford has written lyrics for over 40 years, most notably in partnership with Glenn Tilbrook. The two were primary members in Squeeze and Difford & Tilbrook. According to Difford, he stole 50p from his mother's purse to put a card in a local sweetshop window advertising for a guitarist to join his band, although he did not have one at the time. Tilbrook was the only person who responded to the advert and they met for the first time shortly afterwards. Some of their best-known songs are "Tempted", "Pulling Mussels (From the Shell)", "Black Coffee in Bed", "Cool for Cats", "Up the Junction" and "Annie Get Your Gun".

After the break-up of Squeeze in 1983 Difford continued writing songs for artists such as Jools Holland, Helen Shapiro, Billy Bremner and Elvis Costello. He has also written lyrics for music by Jools Holland, Elton John, Wet Wet Wet, Marti Pellow and others. He was involved with Tilbrook and John Turner in the creation of a musical, Labelled with Love, which was created using the songs of Squeeze. The 1983 musical performed in Deptford was short-lived. In 1984 the pair released the album Difford and Tilbrook and had a minor hit in the UK with Love's Crashing Waves which reached 57 in the UK charts. In 1985 Squeeze reunited, having hits in the US with Babylon and On, "Hourglass" and "853-5937". Difford left the group in 1999 launching a solo career in 2003 with his album I Didn't Get Where I Am. Difford was also manager of Bryan Ferry and The Strypes.  Squeeze reunited again in 2007, and Difford maintains a concurrent solo career alongside his work with the band.

In March 2010, Difford curated Songs in the Key of London, an evening of music dedicated to the capital at the Barbican Centre, London.

In 2017, Chris published his autobiography Some Fantastic Place: My Life In and Out of Squeeze.

Since 2014, Chris has been running the annual Chris Difford Songwriting Retreat, under the auspices of the Buddy Holly Educational Foundation, providing an opportunity for artists to collaborate with one another to write new songs and create new friendships in a relaxed setting in the English countryside.

Personal life
Difford was raised in Greenwich. He lived in New York with his first wife and their two children. He then lived in Rye, Sussex, with the mother of his two youngest children. Currently, he lives just outside Brighton, Sussex with his wife, Louise, whom he married in April 2013.

Solo discography
 I Didn't Get Where I Am, 2003
 South East Side Story, 2007
 The Last Temptation of Chris, 2008
 Cashmere if You Can, 2011, (SMMC Media SMMC1)
 Fancy Pants (with Boo Hewerdine), 2016 (Obvious Productions)
 Let’s Be Combe Avenue (Demos 1972), 2017 (Edsel Records – EDSL 0017)
 Chris To... The Mill, 2017 (Compilation)
 Pants'', 2018

References

External links
Chris Difford official website

1954 births
Living people
English baritones
English record producers
English lyricists
English new wave musicians
English songwriters
Male new wave singers
People from Greenwich
Squeeze (band) members
Ivor Novello Award winners
Musicians from London
Musicians from Kent